Action This Day (foaled February 18, 2001 in Kentucky) is a retired American Thoroughbred racehorse.

Racing career 
In 2003, after winning his maiden race September 28 at Santa Anita Park, he became the first maiden to win the Breeders' Cup Juvenile. After running last for most of the race, he came from off the pace in the homestretch and won by two lengths over Minister Eric. He was voted the U.S. Eclipse Award for Outstanding 2-Year-Old Male Horse.

Action This Day made his 2004 debut on February 8 in the Sham Stakes, finishing fourth. He then ran seventh in the San Felipe Stakes and sixth in the Blue Grass Stakes. Entered into the 2004 Kentucky Derby, he managed a sixth-place finish in the field of 18.

Breeding career 
Retired after the 2004 racing season, Action This Day entered stud at Castleton Farm in Lexington, Kentucky. In 2010 he stood at Dana Point Farm at Lenhartsville, Pennsylvania and the following year at Indiana Stallion Station in Anderson, Indiana. In 2013 Action this Day was sold to Haras Los Azahares to stand in Peru.

References

External links
 Action This Day's pedigree and racing stats

2001 racehorse births
Thoroughbred family 1-n
Racehorses bred in Kentucky
Racehorses trained in the United States
Eclipse Award winners
Breeders' Cup Juvenile winners